Anton Kotzig (22 October 1919 – 20 April 1991) was a Slovak–Canadian mathematician, expert in statistics, combinatorics and graph theory.

The Ringel–Kotzig conjecture on graceful labeling of trees is named after him and Gerhard Ringel.
Kotzig's theorem on the degrees of vertices in convex polyhedra is also named after him.

Biography 
Kotzig was born in Kočovce, a village in Western Slovakia, in 1919. He studied at the secondary grammar school in Nové Mesto nad Váhom, and began his undergraduate studies at Charles University in Prague. After the closure of Czech universities in 1939, he moved to Bratislava, where in 1943 he earned a doctoral degree (RNDr.) in mathematical statistics from Comenius University in Bratislava. He remained in Bratislava working at the Central Bureau of Social Insurance for Slovakia, as the head of department of mathematical statistics.

Later he published a book on economy planning. From 1951 to 1959, he lectured at Vysoká škola Ekonomická (today University of Economics in Bratislava), where he served as rector from 1952 to 1958. Thus he spent 20 years in close contact with applications of mathematics.

In 1959, he left the University of Economics to become the head of the newly created Mathematical Institute of the Slovak Academy of Sciences, where he remained until 1964. From 1965 to 1969, he was head of the department of Applied Mathematics on Faculty of Natural Sciences of Comenius University, where he was also dean for one year. He also earned a habilitation degree (DrSc.) from Charles University in 1961 for a thesis in graph theory (relation and regular relation of finite graphs).
Kotzig established the now well-known Slovak School of Graph Theory. One of his first students was Juraj Bosák, who was awarded the Czechoslovak State Prize in 1969.

In 1969, Kotzig moved to Canada, and spent a year at the University of Calgary. He became a researcher at the Centre de recherches mathematiques (CRM) and the University of Montreal in 1970, where he remained until his death. Because of the political situation, he could not travel back to Czechoslovakia, and remained in his adopted country without his books and notes. Although he was separated from his Slovak students, he continued doing mathematics.

He died on April 20. 1991 in Montreal, leaving his wife Edita, and a son Ľuboš.

Contributions
By 1969, the list of his publications already included over 60 articles and 4 books. Many of his results have become classical, including results about graph relations, 1-factors and cubic graphs. As they were published only in Slovak,  many of them remained unknown and some of the results were independently rediscovered much later by other mathematicians. In Canada he wrote more than 75 additional articles. His publications covers a wide range of topics in graph theory and combinatorics: convex polyhedra, quasigroups, special decompositions into Hamiltonian paths, Latin squares, decompositions of complete graphs, perfect systems of difference sets, additive sequences of permutations, tournaments and  combinatorial games theory.

One of his results, known as Kotzig's theorem, is the statement that every polyhedral graph has an edge whose two endpoints have total degree at most 13. An extreme case is the triakis icosahedron, where no edge has smaller total degree. Kotzig published the result in Slovakia in 1955, and it was named and popularized in the west by Branko Grünbaum in the mid-1970s.

Kotzig published many open problems. One of them is the Ringel–Kotzig conjecture, stating that all trees have a graceful labeling. In 1963, Gerhard Ringel proposed that the complete graph  could be decomposed into isomorphic copies of any given -vertex tree, and in 1966, Alexander Rosa credited Kotzig with the suggestion that a stronger decomposition always existed, equivalent to the existence of a graceful labeling. The question remains unsolved.

Recognition
In honor of Kotzig's 60th birthday, Alexander Rosa, Gert Sabidussi and Jean Turgeon edited a festschrift, Theory and Practice of Combinatorics: A collection of articles honoring Anton Kotzig on the occasion of his sixtieth birthday (Annals of Discrete Mathematics 12, North-Holland, 1982), with contributions from experts from around the world.

In 1999, a commemorative plaque was erected on his birth house in Kočovce on the 80th anniversary of his birth.

See also 
 Kotzig transformations
 Ringel-Kotzig conjecture

References

External links 
 Anton Kotzig, 1919–1991, Mathematica Slovaca 42:3 (1992) 381-383.
 Prof. Anton Kotzig's biography (in Slovak).

Slovak mathematicians
20th-century Canadian mathematicians
Graph theorists
Academic staff of the Université de Montréal
Charles University alumni
Comenius University alumni
Czechoslovak emigrants to Canada

People from Nové Mesto nad Váhom District
1919 births
1991 deaths
Czechoslovak mathematicians